Shiloh Village School District #85 is a public grade school district in Shiloh, Illinois.  It operates Shiloh Elementary School for pre-kindergarten to grade 3, and Shiloh Middle School for grades 4 to 8.

Shiloh Middle School opened in January 2005, and Shiloh Village School was renamed to Shiloh Elementary School.

References

External links
Shiloh Village School District #85 — official site
 Archives of http://www.shiloh.stclair.k12.il.us/ on the Internet Archive Wayback Machine — includes previous versions of websites

Education in St. Clair County, Illinois
School districts in Illinois